P. J. Sebastian was an Indian freedom fighter and social activist from Changanacherry, Kerala.

References 

Year of birth missing
Year of death missing
People from Changanassery
Malayali people
Indian independence activists from Kerala
20th-century Indian politicians